Jamie O'Neill (born 19 August 1986) is an English professional snooker player who lives in Wellingborough.

Career
O'Neill began his professional career by playing Challenge Tour in 2003, at the time the second-level professional tour. He qualified for the 2007/2008 Main Tour by finishing 6th in the International Open Series Order of Merit. He won the sixth of eight events, beating Ashley Wright 6–2 in the final at Prestatyn. O'Neill has also won two significant amateur titles, the 2003 European Under-19 Championship and the 2006 English Open Championship. O'Neill reclaimed his place on the professional Main Tour by finishing sixth on the PIOS rankings.

In May 2019, O'Neill came through Q-School - Event 1 by winning five matches to earn a two-year card on the World Snooker Tour for the 2019/2020 and 2020–21 seasons.

Playing style
He practices at Barratts in Northampton where he has his own Riley Aristocrat table. Professionals Kyren Wilson, Harvey Chandler and Peter Ebdon also practice at the club.

Performance and rankings timeline

Career finals

Amateur finals: 5 (3 titles)

References

External links
 
Jamie O'Neill at worldsnooker.com

Living people
English snooker players
People from Wellingborough
Place of birth missing (living people)
1986 births